Guytar-e Sofla (also Romanized as Gūytar-e Soflá) is a village in Birun Bashm Rural District, Kelardasht District, Chalus County, Mazandaran Province, Iran. At the 2006 census, its population was 682, in 165 families.

References 

Populated places in Chalus County